NE1, or NE-1, or similar may refer to:

 Nebraska Highway 1
 Nebraska's 1st congressional district
 New England Interstate Route 1, now U.S. Route 1
 NE1, a postcode district in Newcastle upon Tyne, England; see NE postcode area
 National Expressway 1 (India)
 HarbourFront MRT station, Singapore
 NE1fm, a radio station in Newcastle upon Tyne, England
 Piper NE-1, a version of the J-3 Cub for the U.S. Navy
 Royal Aircraft Factory N.E.1, a prototype aircraft of the First World War